Çağlayan (literally "Waterfall")  is a town in the central district (Trabzon)  of Trabzon Province, Turkey. At  it is situated along the valley of Altındere creek. It is on Turkish state highway  which connects Trabzon to hinterland (and Sümela Monastery) . The population of the town is 4520   as of 2011. The area around Çağlayan was inhabited during the ancient ages. But Çağlayan is a relatively recent settlement. In 1946 owing to its situation along the valley, it was founded as a common market place of the neighbouring villages. It quickly flourished and In 1969 it was declared a seat of township. The economy of the town depends on agriculture. Lately kiwifruit production is promoted.

References

Populated places in Trabzon Province
Towns in Turkey
Ortahisar